The Builth Volcanic is a geologic formation in Wales. It preserves fossils dating back to the Ordovician period.

See also

 List of fossiliferous stratigraphic units in Wales

References
 

Geologic formations of Wales
Ordovician System of Europe
Ordovician Wales